The Blue Card is a national non-profit organization solely dedicated to providing financial assistance to destitute Holocaust survivors residing in the United States.

History
Established in Germany in 1934, The Blue Card’s sole purpose was to provide financial assistance to Jews fleeing from that country’s growing persecution.  The organization’s name is derived from the blue cards that were given to Jewish donors who raised funds for Jews who lost their jobs.  It was re-established in the United States in 1939, to continue aiding refugees escaping from the Holocaust.  Today, it is the only organization in the United States whose sole mission is to aid needy Holocaust survivors by providing cash assistance.

Charitable work
The Blue Card is a charitable organization aiding Holocaust survivors since 1934.  It is dedicated to the support of European Jewish survivors in this country, who still suffer from the aftereffects of Nazi persecution, are sick or emotionally unstable, have been unable to achieve economic independence, or have lost it through sickness or old age; in many cases the Holocaust has deprived them of a family.  The Blue Card’s activities are not duplicated by any other Jewish welfare agency.  During the year 2013, The Blue Card made grants amounting to nearly $1.9 million.  This brings the grant total since the Blue Card’s inception to $25.5 million.

Programs 
The Blue Card provides aid to over 2,400 annually.  Programs The Blue Card provides to the survivors include:

 The Holocaust Survivor Emergency Cash Assistance Program, which helps pay for essential goods and services such as food, homecare, medicine, and rent, and is funded by the Claims Conference on Jewish Material Claims Against Germany.
 The Curt C. and Else Silberman Dental Program, which funds the survivors' dental care.
 The Stipend Program, which sends monthly checks to survivors.
 The Jewish Holiday Program, which provides survivors money during Jewish holidays ($200 for Passover and High Holidays, $100 for Hanukkah).
 The Adolph and Lotte Rosenberg Summer Vacation Program, which provides a summer vacation to survivors in the New York area, including an itinerary, handicap-accessible accommodations, scheduled meals, and transportation.
 The Jakob Mogilnik Telephone Emergency Response Program, which provides an emergency response system to survivors who cannot pay for installation, service, and maintenance.  The system is programmed in English, German, Hungarian, Russian, and Yiddish.  During an emergency, such as a fall, the survivor will press a button around their neck or wrist which activates an automated speakerphone.  The operator answers in the native language of the caller, asks if an ambulance is necessary, and follows up on the emergency.
 The Mazel Tov Birthday Program, which sends survivors a $100 check and a birthday card on their birthday.
 The Vitamins Program, which provides survivors with liquid meals, minerals, multivitamins, and supplements.
 The Sonia and Max Lonstein Bring a Smile Program, which provides additional support for terminally ill survivors.
 The Siggi B. Wilzig Fighting Cancer Together Program, which offers assistance to survivors diagnosed with cancer, including emotional support, nutrition, medical co-pays, and transportation to appointments.
 The Blue Card-Lissner Hospital Visitation Program, which offers hospital visits to survivors from volunteers.
 The Rita Berkowitz Nutritional Guidance Program, which educates survivors on proper nutrition and provides nutritional supplements and monthly food stipends.

Team Blue Card
Since 2009, The Blue Card has been an Official Charity Partner of the New York City Marathon.  Team BlueCard is The Blue Card's endurance team, which participates in endurance events such as the 2011 TD 5 Borough Bike Tour in New York City and the 2015 Panasonic Life Time Triathlon.  It is composed of participants from countries such as Argentina, Austria, France, Israel, Italy, Mexico, and South Africa.  Team BlueCard has raised over $1,000,000 since 2009.

Events
The Blue Card participates in many fundraising events annually, including:
 The Panasonic Lifetime TRI NYC Triathlon, in which members of Team BlueCard participate in the Panasonic Lifetime TRI NYC Triathlon to raise money for the Blue Card.
 The Miami Marathon & Half Marathon, in which members of Team BlueCard participate in the Miami Marathon & Half Marathon to raise money for the Blue Card.
 The Jerusalem Marathon, in which members of Team BlueCard participate in the annual Jerusalem Marathon to raise money for the Blue Card.
 The Five Boro Bike Tour, in which members of Team BlueCard participate in the TD Five Boro Bike Tour to raise money for the Blue Card.
 Run for the Blue Card, in which members of Team BlueCard participate in the annual ING NYC Marathon to raise money for the Blue Card.
 The 2014 Young Russian Jewish Artists Give Back Art Auction Benefit, which was an art auction to raise money for the Blue Card.
 The Blue Card Annual Benefit Gala, which honors Jewish individuals with either the Max L. Heine Humanitarian Award or the Richard C. Holbrooke Award for Social Justice at a Gala fundraising dinner.
 The 2013 SoulCycle Charity Ride, which raised money for Holocaust survivors battling cancer.
 The Annual Blue Card Ping Pong Social, which includes a ping-pong tournament and a silent auction.

Recognition
In 2013, Charity Navigator announced that the Blue Card earned its ninth consecutive four-star rating for its ability to deliver services in a cost-effective manner.  Fewer than 10% of rated charities have received at least four consecutive four star evaluations, indicating that The Blue Card outperforms most charities in America in its efforts to operate in the most fiscally responsible way possible.

The Blue Card is accredited by the Better Business Bureau’s Wise Giving Alliance.  In order to meet accreditation standards, the Blue Card demonstrated its compliance with 20 stringent regulations regarding transparency standards and effectiveness reporting.  The strictness of the standards ensures that only the most qualified charities are able to maintain their rating.

In 2012 and 2013, the Blue Card was voted one of the Best Jewish Charities by the Federal Times.  The Blue Card was also awarded with the Independent Charities of America (ICA) Best Seal of Excellence.

References

External links 
 The Blue Card's website
 Independent Charities of America
 Better Business Bureau

Charities based in New York City
Holocaust charities and reparations